Rebecca Alban Hoffberger (born September 25, 1952, Baltimore, Maryland) is the founder and director of the American Visionary Art Museum, America's official national museum for outsider art, located in Baltimore, Maryland. A colorful public figure, she has been called “the P. T. Barnum of the outsider art world“.

Biography
Rebecca Alban Hoffberger was born in a “leafy middle-class suburb” of Baltimore, Maryland to Allen, a mechanical engineer, and Peggy Alban, a homemaker. As a child, she suffered a bout with rheumatic fever which left her with painful episodes in her legs and periodic paralysis. "During these periods of illness, Hoffberger found Robert Louis Stevenson’s A Child’s Garden of Verses particularly comforting and therapeutic. She also enjoyed more macabre literature, however, and was drawn to fellow-Baltimorean Edgar Allan Poe at an early age." At age 16, she was accepted to college but turned down the offer to study with the celebrated French mime Marcel Marceau in Paris, becoming the first American ever to do so. In a 2013 Baltimore Magazine article, Hoffberger said, “My parents wanted me to stay in Baltimore and learn to be a secretary or have a practical fallback, but they were very accepting.” While living in Paris, she met and married a ballet dancer who would become her first husband, and after moving back to the United States, gave birth to a daughter, Belina. Hoffberger worked as a development consultant to both a literary society and a ballet company, as well as holding a position at the Boulder Free School in Colorado before eventually moving to Mexico with her daughter. While in Mexico, she met and married her second husband, Andrija Puharich, a notable physician and parapsychologist who was studying traditional healing practices. (Puharich is perhaps best known for bringing Israeli psychic  Uri Geller to the United States.) Hoffberger spent three years with Puharich helping to deliver babies in remote mountain areas in the state of Morelos, and although this marriage also ended, it produced Hoffberger’s second daughter, Athena.

After making her way back to Baltimore, Hoffberger began work as the development director for Sinai Hospital’s "People Encouraging People," a program which provided support to institutionalized psychiatric patients in facilitating their return to the community. She then married her third husband, LeRoy E. Hoffberger — a wealthy attorney and heir of a philanthropic Baltimore family that formerly owned a brewery and a stake in the Baltimore Orioles — who was 27 years her senior. Hoffberger spoke fondly of the psychiatric patients in a 1995 interview with American Style, "I was so impressed with their imagination. I looked at their strengths, not their illness." It was while working with this program that Hoffberger began to develop the idea for a “visionary” museum, the idea which eventually blossomed into the American Visionary Art Museum, or “AVAM.”

Development of the museum
After working with patients at Sinai Hospital’s “People Encouraging People” program, Hoffberger became focused on developing her idea of a "visionary museum”—a facility that would specialize in showcasing the work of self-taught, "visionary" artists, and serve as an education center that emphasized intuitive, creative invention. While developing the idea for the museum, Hoffberger visited Jean Dubuffet’s Collection de l’Art Brut in Lausanne, Switzerland, accompanied by her husband, who eventually became the museum co-founder. During this visit, Rebecca was greatly impressed by Dubuffet’s use of "non art-speak," along with personal artist bios that emphasized the simple facts of the artists' lives, their creative visions, and the use of the artist’s own words. Upon returning to Baltimore, Hoffberger collaborated with the George Ciscle Gallery in Baltimore to mount two successful shows, the first of which featured matchstick artist Gerald Hawkes.

In February 1989, the American Visionary Art Museum (AVAM) was incorporated as a 501(c)3 non-profit organization. The City of Baltimore offered the organization exclusive development rights on the property located at 800 Key Highway—formerly the 1913 offices to the Baltimore Copper Paint Company and an adjacent historic whiskey warehouse—contingent on design, neighborhood approval and obtaining full project funding. Hoffberger began fundraising efforts and received an initial $250,000 planning grant from USF&G, soon followed by a cumulative $2.4 million challenge grant from the Zanvyl & Isabelle Krieger Foundation, matched by many generous private and public grants, along with $1.3 million in bonds issued by The State of Maryland to finance the construction. Otto Billig, M.D. and Edward Adamson (the first proponent of art therapy in Britain) each gifted their important research archives and library collections to AVAM (Billig gifted the museum 400 pieces of art created by mental patients). This same year, Rebecca and LeRoy Hoffberger were married. In 1992, additional contributions for the museum came from The Body Shop founder Anita Roddick and Gordon Roddick. In 1995, LeRoy sold his collection of German Expressionist art via Christie’s to top off final monies needed for the museum, a gift that would ensure that the museum could open debt-free.

On November 24, 1995, the American Visionary Art Museum opened to the public. In her inaugural address, Hoffberger stated that “...the American Visionary Art Museum opens its doors of perception not in an effort to make war on academic or institutionalized learning, but to create a place where the best of self-taught, intuitive contributions of all kinds will be duly recognized, explored, and then championed in a clear strong voice." This statement is echoed in the museum’s Seven Education Goals, penned by Hoffberger, which serve as part of the museum’s mission to function as an education center for “visionary art.” These goals were also adopted by The Lower East Side Girls Club when it was founded in 1996.

AVAM’s Seven Educational Goals:

 Expand the definition of a worthwhile life.
 Engender respect for and delight in the gift of others.
 Increases awareness of the wide variety of choices available in life for all, particularly students.
 Encourage each individual to build upon his or her own special knowledge and inner strengths.
 Promote the use of innate intelligence, intuition, self-exploration and creative self-reliance.
 Confirm the great hunger for finding out just what each of us can do best, in our voice, at any age.
 Empower the individual to choose to do that something really, really well
Today, the museum is known internationally and welcomes over 100,000 visitors annually. In a 2012 article for Maryland Life Magazine, Donya Curie wrote “...in a world where the average earned income—money taken in directly through admission prices and rental fees for weddings, etc.—for an art museum is 29 percent, AVAM reached an all-time record of 72 percent in 2011. “It’s just about unheard of,” Hoffberger says proudly." In the same article, Hoffberger also said, “I think a good museum does more than just have objects that stand there on pedestals. The great ones are all muse-based, connecting viewers to the heart of inspiration." In a 2013 NEA Arts Magazine interview, she remarked, "Visionaries perceive potential and creative relationships where most of us don't. Without visionaries' willingness to be called fools, to make mistakes, to be wrong, few new 'right' things would ever be birthed.”

Awards and accolades
In 1998, Hoffberger was elected and served as a member of the Baltimore City Chamber of Commerce. The previous year, she won The Urban Land Institute’s coveted National Award for Excellence, and in 1996, she received the prestigious Gold Meir Award from Israel Bonds. In addition to Honorary Doctorates from McDaniel College, Pennsylvania College of Art and Design, Stevenson University, and Maryland Institute College of Art, Hoffberger was awarded the title of “Dame” for her work on behalf of establishing medical field hospitals in Nigeria. She has been the recipient of numerous mental health advocacy and equal opportunity awards and has served as a Director of Jewish Education and on the Board of The Elisabeth Kubler-Ross Center, and has also been a featured speaker at many events, including 2009‘s TEDxMidAtlantic.

Awards

 Honorary Doctorate, McDaniel College, 2011
 Katherine Coffey Award, Mid-Atlantic Association of Museums, 2011
 Honorary Doctorate, Pennsylvania College of Art and Design, 2007
 President’s Award of the Maryland YWCA, 2006
 Inducted into the Maryland Women’s Hall of Fame, 2006
 Commencement Speaker and Honorary Doctor of Humane Letters, Stevenson University, 2004
 Visionary Award, On Our Own of Maryland, Inc., 2002
 Conrad Nelson Lecturer, Franklin & Marshall College, 2001
 Elected to Baltimore City Chamber of Commerce, 1998-2002
 Named one of Maryland’s “Top 100 Women” by The Daily Record, 1998
 Maryland State Women in the Arts Award, 1998
 National Award for Excellence, Urban Land Institute, 1998
 Open Your Mind Humanitarian Award, Alliance for the Mentally Ill, 1997
 Honorary Doctorate, Maryland Institute College of Art, 1996
 Distinguished Volunteer, Maryland Association of Psychosocial Programs, 1996
 Israel Bonds Golda Meir Award Honoree, 1996
 Sarah’s Circle Award, College of Notre Dame of Maryland, 1996
 Baltimore Urban League’s Award for Outstanding Community Involvement and Support for Equal Opportunity, 1995

Criticism
At the time of the museum’s 1995 opening, it was reported that Hoffberger’s rejection of academic scholarship and her refusal to follow tradition had upset prominent members of the art world. Hoffberger is known as a renegade in the art world, assuming a posture of self-conscious eccentricity. But she has been criticized for her lack of interest in conventional art history and conventional museum practices. (For example, she refuses to hire a professional art curator.) A 2000 article in The New York Times quoted an art authority who referred to her as “a self-aggrandizing dilettante rather than a serious champion of the works her museum exhibits”.

Despite all this, the museum has won the support of collectors, critics, and the public through its exhibitions that examine the relationship of art to the human condition rather than to the canon of art history. Since its inception, Hoffberger has shied away from certain conventional museum practices, something which is a point of pride for the museum. Instead of hiring a professional art curator, she prefers to use guest curators for each of the museum’s exhibitions, which instead of focusing on the work of just one artist, are thematic in nature.

References

American art curators
American women curators
Living people
1952 births
People from Baltimore
Outsider art
21st-century American women